Howard Marc Radzely (born 1970) is an American lawyer who served as the United States Deputy Secretary of Labor from December 19, 2007 through February 2, 2009.

Education and early career 
Radzely graduated summa cum laude from the University of Pennsylvania's Wharton School of Business and magna cum laude from the Harvard Law School, where he served on the Harvard Law Review.  After graduating from law school, Radzely clerked for J. Michael Luttig, United States Court of Appeals for the Fourth Circuit, and for Antonin Scalia, Supreme Court of the United States.  Radzely was subsequently an attorney in private practice in Washington, D.C., concentrating in labor and employment law.

Department of Labor 
Mr. Radzely first joined the Department of Labor on June 4, 2001, as the Deputy Solicitor of Labor. He served as both the Deputy Solicitor and Acting Solicitor of Labor from June 2001 until January 2002. He also served as Acting Solicitor from January 2003 until his confirmation as Solicitor on December 9, 2003, where he served for over three years.

President George W. Bush designated Mr. Radzely the Acting Deputy Secretary of Labor effective January 24, 2007, and nominated him for the permanent position on May 10, 2007. Mr. Radzely was confirmed by the U.S. Senate as Deputy Secretary on December 19, 2007. During this same period, Radzely also served on the board of directors for the Overseas Private Investment Corporation, a government agency that aids U.S. businesses in overseas investment and economic development, and he was a designated member of the Congressional-Executive Commission on China, which monitors China’s human rights record and legal development.

Radzely served as the Acting Secretary of Labor from January 20, 2009, until February 2, 2009. As of the latter date, President Barack Obama appointed Department of Labor Deputy Assistant Secretary Edward C. Hugler to act as Secretary.

Later career 
On July 1, 2009, Radzely joined the global law firm Morgan, Lewis & Bockius as a partner in its labor and employment law practice. He currently works as a Senior Vice President and Assistant General Counsel at The Boeing Company.

See also 
 List of law clerks of the Supreme Court of the United States (Seat 9)

References

|-

|-

1970 births
American chief operating officers
George W. Bush administration personnel
Obama administration cabinet members
Harvard Law School alumni
Law clerks of the Supreme Court of the United States
Living people
Maryland lawyers
United States Deputy Secretaries of Labor
Wharton School of the University of Pennsylvania alumni
Law clerks of J. Michael Luttig